Stefan Dimitrov (22 November 1939 in Burgas, Bulgaria – 13 August 2004 in Sofia, Bulgaria, Bulgarian: Стефан Димитров) was a basso opera singer. Born in the Black Sea town of Burgas, Bulgaria, he was of Greek origin. He won four international singing competitions at the very beginning of his career: those in Toulouse, the "Erkel" in Budapest, the "s’Hertogenbosch" in the Netherlands, and the "Young Opera Singers" in Sofia. In 1965 Stefan Dimitrov met the piano accompanist and répétiteur, Malina Dimitrova (Bulgarian: Малина Димитрова), who graduated at this time and took her first steps in the opera accompanying field. They were later to be married. The couple had one son, Liuben, who graduated as solo pianist and later become part of the Genova & Dimitrov piano duo.

Early career

He graduated from the Central Master Studio of Singing of the Sofia State Music Academy under its founder and leader Prof. Christo Brumbarov, the teacher of singers such as Nicolai Ghiaurov, Nicola Ghiuselev, Ghena Dimitrova and others.

An invitation to pursue a post-graduate master's degree at the Bolshoi Theatre in Moscow followed. There Stefan sang under conductors such as B. Haikin, Y. Simonov (General Music Director of the Bolshoi at the time), M. Ermler, A. Lazarev, F. Mansurov and worked on stage presentation under Boris Pokrovski and his assistants. Together with partners such as Yevgeny Nesterenko, Elena Obraszova, Irina Archipova and Vladimir Atlantov, Dimitrov performed a number of roles: Boris in Boris Godunov, Don Basilio in Il Barbiere di Seviglia, the Grand Inquisitor in Don Carlos, Prince Galitzki and Khan Konchak in Prince Igor, Sparafucile in Rigoletto and others. Numerous engagements resulted in Stefan Dimitrov performing in many opera and concert theatres in Moscow and former UdSSR.

National and international career
After they came back to Bulgaria, Stefan and Malina Dimitrova were invited as permanent soloist and chief répétiteur of the National State Opera Theatres of Sofia and of Rousse on the Danube, and they appeared with these ensembles in numerous tours to Spain, Germany, the Czech Republic, France and Italy. During his activities as soloist in Greece, Italy, France, Netherlands, Germany, Belgium, Luxembourg and in all Eastern Europe Stefan Dimitrov worked under conductors and stage directors such as W. Eichner, I. Ranzescu, A. Naydenov, I. Marinov, M. Angelov, Al. Raychev.

In 1980, Stefan and Malina launched their relationship with Belgium's leading opera house, La Monnaie / De Munt in Brussels under its director Gerard Mortier. Later on, this collaboration grew to include the Vlaamse Opera company in Antwerp.

Under conductors such as Sir John Pritchard, Silvio Varviso, Machael Schonwandt, Silvain Cambreling and stage directors such as Adolf Dresen, Kurt Horez, Pierre Constant, the singer had many engagements, including guest appearances under the auspices of La Monnaie and the Vlaamse Opera throughout Europe. During this period Stefan Dimitrov's partners on stage were singers such as José van Dam, Ermanno Mauro, Karita Mattila, and Leona Mitchell.

Dimitrov died, aged 64, in Sofia.

Awards

During his musical career Stefan Dimitrov was awarded many prizes for his artistic achievements in Bulgaria, Germany, Belgium (Special Merits of the Queen) and in France and was presented in the 1999 "Who Is Who in Bulgaria" and the 2000 "Who is Who in Bulgarian Culture".

Recordings
Stefan Dimitrov made a number of studio and live recording sessions at numerous radio and TV broadcasting corporations in Bulgaria, Belgium, Netherlands, France, etc. as well as a few CD releases for EMI.

Selected repertoire

Beethoven, L. Van – 9th Symphony 
Bellini, V. – I Capuleti e i Montecchi - Capelio
Borodin, Al. – Prince Igor - Prince Galitzki & Khan Konchak 
Donizetti, G. - Viva La Mama - Mama Agata 
Donizetti, G. - L'elisir d'amore -  Dulcamara 
Donizetti, G. - Lucia di Lammermoor - Raimondo 
Glinka, M. - Ivan Susanin - Ivan Sussanin 
Gounod, Ch. - Faust - Mephisto
Mozart, W.A. - Die Zauberflöte - Zarastro 
Mozart, W.A. - Requiem 
Mussorgsky, M. - Boris Godunov - Boris Godunov, Varlaam, Pimen 
Nikolai, O. – Die lustigen Weiber von Windsor - Falstaff 
Puccini, G. – Turandot - Timur 
Prokofiev, S. – Semyon Kotko - Tkachenko 
Rossini, G. - Il barbiere di Siviglia - Don Basilio 
Rossini, G. - L'italiana in Algeri - Mustafa 
Rossini, G. - La gazza ladra - Gotardo 
Rossini, G. - Stabat Mater -
Saint-Saëns, C. – Samson et Dalila - Abimelech 
Smetana, B. – The Bartered Bride - Kezal 
Tchaikovsky, P. – Eugene Onegin - Prince Gremin 
Verdi, G. - Don Carlos - King Philip  & The Great Inquisitor 
Verdi, G. - Nabucco - Zaccaria 
Verdi, G. - Simon Boccanegra - Fiesco 
Verdi, G. - Aida - Ramphis and the King 
Verdi, G. - Il trovatore - Ferrando
Verdi, G. - Un ballo in maschera - Tom 
Verdi, G. - Rigoletto - Sparafucile and Monterone 
Verdi, G. - Macbeth - Banquo
Verdi, G. - Stiffelio - Borg
Verdi, G. - Messa da Requiem - 
Wagner, R. - Der fliegende Holländer - Daland 
Wagner, R. - Tannhäuser - Biterolf 
Wagner, R. - Die Meistersinger von Nürnberg

See also

 La Monnaie
 De Vlaamse Opera
 Rousse State Opera

References

External links
 Opera & Philharmonic Society Rousse
 YouTube Channel

1939 births
2004 deaths
20th-century Bulgarian male opera singers
Operatic basses
Musicians from Burgas